

Beorhtsige was a medieval Bishop of Rochester.

There is some uncertainty about Beorhtsige's existence, but he possibly was consecrated between 946 and 949. He died between 955 and 964.

Citations

References

External links
 

Bishops of Rochester
10th-century English bishops
10th-century deaths
Year of birth unknown